Parasoft (officially Parasoft Corporation) is an independent software vendor specializing in automated software testing and application security with headquarters in Monrovia, California. It was founded in 1987 by four graduates of the California Institute of Technology who planned to commercialize the parallel computing software tools they had been working on for the Caltech Cosmic Cube, which was the first working hypercube computer built.

During the 90's, Parasoft leveraged technology in their parallel software toolkit to create software test automation tools for traditional software development as well as parallel. Starting with runtime error detection for C and C++ with their Insure++ product, they also added capabilities for static code analysis, unit testing, and ultimately expanded to include application security, functional testing, and service virtualization.

Technologies
Parasoft develops automated defect prevention technologies that support the Automated Defect Prevention methodology developed by Adam Kolawa. These technologies automate a number of defect prevention practices for Java, C and C++, and .NET. The static code analysis practice identifies coding issues that lead to security, reliability, performance, and maintainability issues later on. In 1996, Parasoft submitted a patent application for their rule-based static code analysis. Since then, the original static analysis technology has been extended to include security static analysis, data flow analysis, and software metrics. In 1996, Parasoft submitted patent applications for technology that automatically generates unit test cases. Since then, the original unit testing technology has been extended to include code coverage analysis, regression testing, and traceability. The peer code review practice involves manually inspecting source code to examine algorithms, review design, and search for subtle errors that automated tools cannot detect. Although the peer inspection itself cannot be automated, peer code reviews preparation, notification, and tracking can be automated.

For cloud, SOA, APIs, and enterprise IT environments, Parasoft technologies automate practices such as API testing, integration testing, system testing, load testing, and penetration testing. Parasoft's service and SOA quality technology was first developed in 2002.

Parasoft also develops memory error detection technology that finds run-time errors in C and C++ programs.
Patents were submitted for this technology in 1995 and 1996.

For service virtualization, Parasoft technologies are used to automatically capture and emulate dependent system behavior of mainframes, third-party components, or any system component that is unavailable or difficult to access for development and testing purposes.

Parasoft's various technologies are used for demonstrating industry or regulatory compliance and adopting Agile software development, DevOps, Continuous delivery, Continuous testing, and Test automation.
Parasoft joined the Eclipse Consortium board of stewards in 2002.

Several analyst reports and software industry publications mentioned the company's service virtualization technology and embedded system software development tools.

Awards and recognition
Parasoft received the "Customers' Choice" award from Gartner in March 2019 for "Best Software test Automation Software of 2019" as reviewed by customers. The Gartner's Customer Choice aware is based on vetted user surveys over the course of a year on the Gartner Peer Insights platform.

Parasoft SOAtest was recognized as a leader by Forrester in the 2018 Forrester Wave Omnichannel Functional Test Tools. The reported said "Parasoft shined in our evaluation specifically around effective test maintenance, strong CI/CD and application lifecycle management (ALM Application Lifecycle Management) platform integration".

Parasoft received a "Best in Show" in software development award in the testing category from SD Times in 2018 as part of the SD Times 100 list.

Global structure

Headquarters and Americas
Parasoft is a provider of software test automation tools and analytics with its global headquarters in the Monrovia, California.

Parasoft has distributors in Canada and Latin America to provide local sales and technical support.

EMEA
Parasoft has a presence in EMEA which centers around offices in Krakow, Poland and The Hague, Netherlands. 

Parasoft has subsidiaries in Berlin, Germany, London, UK, and Stockholm, Sweden, with distributors in France, Italy, Israel, and South Africa.

APAC
In Shanghai, China Parasoft has a subsidiary. Parasoft also has subsidiaries in Bangalore, India and Singapore.

References

Abstract interpretation
Companies based in Los Angeles County, California
Companies established in 1987
Computer security software
Computer security software companies
Development software companies
Software companies based in California
Software testing tools
Static program analysis tools
Unit testing
Unit testing frameworks
Software companies of the United States